Saint-Saturnin-lès-Apt (literally Saint-Saturnin near Apt; Provençal: Sant Savornin d’Ate) is a commune in the Vaucluse department in the Provence-Alpes-Côte d'Azur region in southeastern France.

Twin towns
 Castelfranco di Sopra, Italy

See also
Communes of the Vaucluse department
Luberon

Gallery

References

Communes of Vaucluse
Vaucluse communes articles needing translation from French Wikipedia